Silvanoides is a genus of beetles in the family Silvanidae, containing the following species:

 Silvanoides cheesmanae Halstead
 Silvanoides cribricollis Grouvelle
 Silvanoides foveicollis Halstead

References

Silvanidae genera